Bose Collins is a graphic design, moving image & creative agency. They are best known for their work with Sony launching the PlayStation, National Geographic cover artworks, films for Nespresso, Ralph Lauren, Vichy, Estée Lauder, Elemis, Jo Malone, Audi, Bulova, British Airways, TEDx, global reveals for Nissan and NASA and the cover artworks for albums including James Blunt "Back to Bedlam", "All the Lost Souls" and "Moon Landing".

External links 
Official Website

British graphic designers